David Murray (born ), commonly known as The 8-Bit Guy, is an American retrocomputing enthusiast and video game developer who runs a YouTube channel under the same name.

History
Murray launched his YouTube channel in 2006 under the username adric22. He worked on repairing and refurbishing iBook G3 and G4 laptops and later on MacBooks, buying and selling them on eBay, and later from his own website. He called himself the iBook Guy. He made videos to show how he repairs some of the equipment, but had made his living with the actual repairs and resales. In 2011, he shut down his repair business.

Five months after creating his channel, David and his brother created a channel called MyPCHelp. The channel would mostly upload computer tutorials for the average Joe to understand.

Murray noticed his general videos about computing were attracting more subscribers. In 2015, he renamed his primary channel to "The 8-Bit Guy" and focused on retrocomputing. He says an average episode takes about 15 hours to produce.

Murray ran several different YouTube channels with topics such as keyboard instruments from the 1980s, coin collecting, and airguns, although the latter two did not have as much popularity as his retrocomputing videos so he stopped uploading videos to them.

Murray was dissatisfied with his long used in-home filming studio, so in 2020 he began construction on a small building in his backyard which would hold his new studio. In 2021, the new studio was finished and became Murray's primary filming location.

Content
The channel is known for its videos on restoration of old computers, and demonstration of old technology. Murray has also developed video games designed to run on old computers, including Planet X1 for the VIC-20, Planet X2 for Commodore 64, Planet X3 for MS-DOS and Attack of the PETSCII Robots for the Commodore PET. He has demonstrated the development of these games on his YouTube channel. In addition, Murray is working on the Commander X16, an 8 bit computer inspired by the Commodore 64, made using off the shelf modern parts. Murray is also passionate about electric cars, and has published videos about them on his channel.

Murray also co-hosts the GeekBits podcast alongside his brother Mike Murray and friend Craig Bowes.

Personal life 
Murray lives in the Dallas–Fort Worth area in Texas. Murray's second cousin was musician Dimebag Darrell
.

Murray used to work for AST Research as a tech support specialist.

References

American video game programmers
Entertainers from Dallas
Living people
Technology YouTubers
Year of birth missing (living people)
YouTube channels launched in 2006
YouTubers from Texas